Yenikapı is an indefinitely closed railway station on the İstanbul-Halkalı Line in the Yenikapı neighborhood of Istanbul, Turkey. The station was built in 1872 by the Oriental Railway which was then taken over by the Turkish State Railways in 1937 and electrified in 1955. Due to the rehabilitation of the line between Halkalı and Kazlıçeşme for future Marmaray commuter service, Yenikapı was indefinitely closed on 19 March 2013. On 29 October 2013, the new underground Yenikapı railway station, which makes up a part of the new Yenikapı Transfer Center, was opened along with the trans-Bosphorus Marmaray tunnel. The new Yenikapı complex is located right next to the existing railway station and is serviced by 3 lines of the Istanbul Metro.

References

Railway stations in Istanbul Province
Railway stations opened in 1872
Railway stations closed in 2013
1872 establishments in the Ottoman Empire
2013 disestablishments in Turkey